The Cowboy Kid is a 1928 American silent Western film directed by Clyde Carruth and written by James J. Tynan. The film stars Rex Bell, Mary Jane Temple, Brooks Benedict, Alice Belcher, Joseph De Grasse and Syd Crossley. The film was released on July 15, 1928, by Fox Film Corporation.

Cast
 Rex Bell as Jim Barrett
 Mary Jane Temple as Janet Grover
 Brooks Benedict as Trig Morgan
 Alice Belcher as Lilly Langton
 Joseph De Grasse as John Grover
 Syd Crossley as Sheriff
 Billy Bletcher as Deputy Sheriff

References

External links 
 

1928 films
Fox Film films
1928 Western (genre) films
American black-and-white films
Silent American Western (genre) films
1920s English-language films
1920s American films